The 2001 Syracuse Orangemen football team represented  Syracuse University during the 2001 NCAA Division I-A football season. The Orange were coached by Paul Pasqualoni and played their home games in the Carrier Dome in Syracuse, New York.

Schedule

Roster

References

Syracuse
Syracuse Orange football seasons
Guaranteed Rate Bowl champion seasons
Syracuse Orangemen football